Cameron Gaunce (born March 19, 1990) is a Canadian professional ice hockey defenceman who is currently playing with the Ontario Reign of the American Hockey League (AHL). Gaunce was selected by Colorado Avalanche in the second round, 50th overall, of the 2008 NHL Entry Draft.

Playing career
Gaunce grew up in Markham, Ontario, playing minor ice hockey with the Ontario Minor Hockey Association (OMHA) Markham Waxers, where he was a teammate of Steven Stamkos, Michael Del Zotto and Cody Hodgson. He played in the 2003 Quebec International Pee-Wee Hockey Tournament with Markham. He was selected 50th overall by the Colorado Avalanche in the 2008 NHL Entry Draft. Gaunce played with the Mississauga St. Michael's Majors of the Ontario Hockey League (OHL) for three seasons, and on May 11, 2009, he signed a three-year, entry-level contract with the Avalanche and attended the 2009 Avalanche's training camp before returning for his final year with the Majors in the 2009–10 season.

In his first professional season, in 2010–11, Gaunce was assigned to Colorado's American Hockey League (AHL) affiliate, the Lake Erie Monsters. After 54 games with the Monsters, he was called-up to the NHL and made his NHL debut in Colorado's 5–3 defeat against the Nashville Predators on February 12, 2011. In his third game with the Avalanche, he scored his first NHL goal and point against Marc-André Fleury and the Pittsburgh Penguins in a 3–2 loss on February 16.

During the 2012–13 season, while playing with the Monsters and in the final year of his entry-level contract, on April 2, 2013, Gaunce was traded to the Dallas Stars in exchange for Tomáš Vincour. On December 17, 2013, Gaunce was called-up to the Stars.

In September 2014, after failing to make the Stars' NHL roster out of training camp, Gaunce was assigned to Dallas' AHL affiliate, the Texas Stars.

On July 1, 2015, after he was not tendered a qualifying offer to remain with the Stars, Gaunce signed as a free agent to a one-year, two-way contract with the Florida Panthers. Gaunce was assigned to add leadership to Florida's AHL affiliate, the Portland Pirates, for the duration of the 2015–16 season. He responded by setting career-high numbers offensively with 37 points in 75 games.

On July 1, 2016, as a free agent, Gaunce signed a one-year, two-way contract with the Pittsburgh Penguins. In the 2016–17 season, he began playing in the AHL with the Wilkes-Barre/Scranton Penguins. With Pittsburgh suffering a depleted blueline through injury, Gaunce was recalled and eclipsed his previous efforts in the NHL to record a career-high 1 goal and 4 points in 12 games.

On July 1, 2017, as a free agent for the third straight year, Gaunce signed a two-year, two-way contract with the Columbus Blue Jackets. In the 2017–18 season, after attending the Blue Jackets' training camp, Gaunce was reassigned to Columbus' AHL affiliate, the Cleveland Monsters. In making his return to his first professional club in the Monsters, Gaunce added a veteran presence on the blueline and led the defence in scoring with 21 assists and 24 points.

On July 1, 2018, Gaunce signed a one-year, two-way contract with the Tampa Bay Lightning.

Following two productive seasons within the Lightning organizations, Gaunce left as a free agent leading into the pandemic delayed 2020–21 season. Unable to secure a NHL deal, Gaunce agreed to a one-year AHL contract with the Ontario Reign, affiliate to the Los Angeles Kings, on January 28, 2021. In the shortened AHL season, Gaunce contributed with 3 goals and 13 points in 24 games.  In his second season with the Reign in the 2021–22 season, Gaunce featured regularly in 61 regular season games, collecting 7 goals and 27 points. He played in all five playoff games with the Reign in their divisional semi-final defeat to the Colorado Eagles.

On July 27, 2022, Gaunce opted to return for a third season with the Reign, re-signing to a one-year contract.

Personal
Gaunce's younger brother Brendan currently plays as a left winger in the Columbus Blue Jackets organization. Brendan, who was selected second overall by the Belleville Bulls in the 2010 OHL Priority Selection, was selected in the first round, 26th overall, by the Canucks in the 2012 NHL Entry Draft.

Career statistics

Awards and honours

References

External links
 

1990 births
Canadian ice hockey defencemen
Cleveland Monsters players
Colorado Avalanche draft picks
Colorado Avalanche players
Dallas Stars players
Ice hockey people from Ontario
Lake Erie Monsters players
Living people
Mississauga St. Michael's Majors players
Ontario Reign (AHL) players
Pittsburgh Penguins players
Portland Pirates players
Sportspeople from Greater Sudbury
Syracuse Crunch players
Tampa Bay Lightning players
Texas Stars players
Wilkes-Barre/Scranton Penguins players